The Koireng people are one of the indigenous peoples inhabiting Manipur in North-East India. They have a shared common ancestry, history, cultural traits, folklore and dialects with their kindred people like Aimol and Kom.

References
 Shakespear, J. (1909) 'The Kuki–Lushai Clans.' The Journal of the Royal Anthropological Institute of Great Britain and Ireland. Vol. 39 (Jul., 1909), pp. 371–385
 https://web.archive.org/web/20131107225208/http://censusindia.gov.in/Tables_Published/SCST/ST%20Lists.pdf
 http://www.joshuaproject.net/peopctry.php
 Shakespear, J. (1922) Tangkhul Folk Tales and Notes on Some Festivals of the Hill Tribes South of Assam. 14 pp.
 McCulloch/ Major W., 'Account of the valley of Munnipore and of the Hill Tribes'. Selections from the Records of the Government of India, No. 27 (Calcutta) 1859
 Grierson, G. A. (Ed.) (1904b). Tibeto-Burman Family: Specimens of the Kuki-Chin and Burma Groups, # Volume III Part III of Linguistic Survey of India. Office of the Superintendent of Government Printing, Calcutta.
 Ethnic Races of Manipur

Scheduled Tribes of Manipur
Kuki tribes